Jan Petter Rasmussen  (born 1 June 1947) is a Norwegian politician.

He was born in Stavanger to Otto Rasmussen and Jenny Bakke. He served as mayor of Eigersund from 1990 to 1996. He was elected representative to the Storting for the period 1997–2001 for the Labour Party.

References

1947 births
Living people
Politicians from Stavanger
Labour Party (Norway) politicians
Members of the Storting
Mayors of places in Rogaland